Looking for Iilonga is a Namibian short film directed by Tim Huebschle in 2011.

Plot 
Confronted by a loan shark who is collecting what he is owed, Simon is faced with one option only: he has to repay his family's debts. Ripped from his comfortable rural lifestyle, he travels far away to the big city, hoping to work off the debts. But from the moment he sets foot in the city, everything seems to be against Simon.

Production  
Looking for Iilonga was shot in and around Windhoek over four days in November 2010. The screenplay was written by Tim Huebschle and Nailoke Mhanda, based on an idea by Nailoke. The actors translated their respective lines into Oshivambo.

The film was uploaded to YouTube in February 2019. By June of the same year it was watched 75,000 times.

Cast 
 Onemus Uupindi as Simon
 Ilke Platt as Amanda
 Aune Hamunyela as Elizabeth
 Immanuel Namwandi as Kondjashili

References

External links

 
 
 Looking for Iilonga on South Planet

Films set in Namibia
Namibian short films
2011 films
Films shot in Namibia
Namibian drama films